Alatarla can refer to:

 Alatarla, Elâzığ
 Alatarla, Oltu